The 1926 Samuel Huston Dragons football team was an American football team that represented Samuel Huston College as member of the Southwestern Athletic Conference (SWAC) during the 1926 college football season. Led by first-year head coach William S. Taylor, Samuel Huston won the SWAC title with a mark of 5–0 in conference play.

Schedule

References

Samuel Huston
Samuel Huston Dragons football seasons
Southwestern Athletic Conference football champion seasons
College football undefeated seasons
Samuel Huston Dragons football